The Enemy Inside is the second studio album by Japanese rock band Coldrain. Recorded at Innig Recording Hostelry in Fujisawa, Japan, which was self-produced by Masato Hayakawa and Ryo Yokochi, it was released on February 16, 2011, by VAP.

The Enemy Inside was exclusively released in Japan, along with their debut studio outing Final Destination, which was released two years prior. The Enemy Inside debuted at number 21 on the Oricon Albums Chart, charting for the following 5 weeks before dropping out of the charts completely. 

The album would spawn singles such as the lead single, "To Be Alive", which would be released at the start of February, two weeks preceding the release of The Enemy Inside. "Rescue Me", the second and last single on the album was released on the 10th of the following month.

This would become the first release by the band to feature a different vocalist on one of their tracks for the first time. Manabu Taniguchi, known by his stage name Mah from Japanese ska-punk band SiM, would feature on "The Maze" on the record which would track a little over 37 minutes.

Musical style
The Enemy Inside has been stylistically described as being post-hardcore, punk rock, alternative rock, alternative metal and screamo.

Track listing

Personnel
Credits retrieved from album's liner notes.

Coldrain
  – lead vocals, producer
  – lead guitar, producer
  – rhythm guitar, backing vocals
  – bass guitar, backing vocals
  – drums

Guest feature
  of SiM – guest vocals on "The Maze"

Additional personnel
 Satoshi Hosoi – recording engineer, mixing
 Yoichi Imaizumi – assistant engineer
 Hiromichi Takiguchi – mastering (Parasight Mastering, Tokyo)
 Daichi Takahashi – instrument technician
 Jun Yamada – instrument technician

Charts

References

External links

2011 albums
Coldrain albums
Punk rock albums by Japanese artists
Albums produced by Masato Hayakawa